Hospitals-Meddelelser (Hospital Communications) was a Danish medical journal founded by Carl Edvard Marius Levy and published from 1848 to 1856. Søren Eskildsen Larsen, the chief surgeon at Almindelig Hospital, was co-editor from 1848 to 1853.

References

General medical journals